Michael Weier (born 27 January 1997) is an Australian professional footballer who plays as a goalkeeper for Newcastle Jets.

References

External links

Living people
1997 births
Australian soccer players
Association football goalkeepers
Brisbane Strikers FC players
Newcastle Jets FC players
A-League Men players
National Premier Leagues players
Australian people of German descent